Keyta was used instead of soap in Iceland before it was introduced there. Keyta was made by storing urine from domestic animals for some time, the alkaline fluid left over is rich in urea which is ideal for cleansing wool for example.  It is also a good fertilizer. Sometimes human urine was used in its basic state, and it would be used for bathing. 

Keyta was also heavily used to wash show-winning live-stock, especially hairy pigs such as boar. This is referred to as Svínskeggur. Farm animals which have been cleansed using this process are referred to as Addi. 

Social history of Iceland